Gina Fattore (born June 18, 1968, in Kankakee, Illinois, USA) is an American producer known for her creation of USA Network series Dare Me. She was also a producer and writer for popular TV shows such as Dawson's Creek, Gilmore Girls, and Parenthood.

Biography 
Fattore grew up in Valparaiso, Indiana. She graduated from Columbia University in 1990 as an English major. Her classmates included television writers Jeff Rake and Academy Award-winning film producer Dede Gardner. After college, she worked at the New York Public Library's fundraising office under Judy Daniels, whose son Greg Daniels would later become creator of The Office. She was encouraged by her then boss to work for her son as an assistant. Fattore accepted the job and relocated to Los Angeles and began her career in the entertainment industry.

Her first assignment was Daniels' King of the Hill, where she got her first writing credit as staff writer. She then joined the crew of Dawson's Creek and rose from a writer to the show's co-executive producer for Season 5 and 6. She wrote the episode titled "True Love," in which a scene showing a crying Dawson Leery became the subject of a longstanding internet meme.

She went on to work on other hit series and became a co-producer and writer of such hit TV shows as Gilmore Girls, Parenthood, and Californication.

In 2012, she signed an overall deal with Universal TV to produce content for the channel and sold a multi-cultural family drama titled Holiday to the network.

In April 2020, she published a novel titled The Spinster Diaries, which follows the life of a fictional Los Angeles television writer as she navigates work, love life, and the diagnosis of a benign tumor that drew parts of the plot from her own life.

In August 2020, Fattore signed an overall deal with Universal Content Productions to create and develop scripted fare for all platforms for the studio.

Filmography

Awards and nominations 
Fattore was nominated for a 2010 Producers Guild Award for her work on Californication and a 2016 Writers Guild of America Award for Television: New Series for writing Better Things.

References

External links 

American women screenwriters
People from Valparaiso, Indiana
1968 births
Living people
Columbia College (New York) alumni
American film producers
American women film producers
21st-century American women